Lee Bok-hee (also Lee Bok-hui, ; born December 13, 1978 in Seoul) is a South Korean judoka, who competed in the women's half-middleweight category. She won fourteen medals in her career, including a silver in the 2001 East Asian Games in Osaka, Japan, achieved fifth-place finishes at the 2003 World Judo Championships, and represented her nation South Korea in the 63-kg class at the 2004 Summer Olympics.

Lee emerged onto the world stage at the 2001 East Asian Games in Osaka, Japan, where she won a silver medal in the 63-kg division, losing the final by a "yusei" victory to Chinese judoka and 2000 Olympic silver medalist Li Shufang. This was followed by a share of bronze medal with Russia's Anna Saraeva in the similar category at the Summer Universiade in Beijing, China. As Japan hosted the 2003 World Judo Championships in Osaka, Lee finished in fifth place after losing the bronze medal match to Germany's Anna von Harnier.

At the 2004 Summer Olympics in Athens, Lee qualified for the South Korean squad in the women's half-middleweight class (63 kg), by placing second and receiving a berth from the Asian Championships in Almaty, Kazakhstan. She lost her opening match to Argentina's Daniela Krukower by a golden-score point and a tani otoshi (belt drop) in a close fight. In the repechage, Lee gave herself a chance for an Olympic bronze medal, but slipped it away in a defeat to France's Lucie Décosse, who scored more points than her on waza-ari and threw her down the tatami with a kuchiki taoshi (single leg takedown) assault during their five-minute first round match.

Since her retirement from competition in late 2006, Lee has served and committed as a lifetime coach for her newly-wed husband Choi Sun-ho, who later competed for South Korea in the 90-kg division at the 2008 Summer Olympics in Beijing.

References

External links

1978 births
Living people
Olympic judoka of South Korea
Judoka at the 2004 Summer Olympics
Sportspeople from Seoul
South Korean female judoka
Universiade medalists in judo
Universiade bronze medalists for South Korea